St. Aloysius Degree College is located in Cox Town, Bangalore, Karnataka, India. It was established in 2008 by the Archdiocese of Bangalore.

References

External links
 

Colleges in Bangalore